Digital subscriber line (DSL; originally digital subscriber loop) is a family of technologies that are used to transmit digital data over telephone lines. In telecommunications marketing, the term DSL is widely understood to mean asymmetric digital subscriber line (ADSL), the most commonly installed DSL technology, for Internet access.

DSL service can be delivered simultaneously with wired telephone service on the same telephone line since DSL uses higher frequency bands for data. On the customer premises, a DSL filter on each non-DSL outlet blocks any high-frequency interference to enable simultaneous use of the voice and DSL services.

The bit rate of consumer DSL services typically ranges from 256 kbit/s to over 100 Mbit/s in the direction to the customer (downstream), depending on DSL technology, line conditions, and service-level implementation. Bit rates of 1 Gbit/s have been reached.

In ADSL, the data throughput in the upstream direction (the direction to the service provider) is lower, hence the designation of asymmetric service. In symmetric digital subscriber line (SDSL) services, the downstream and upstream data rates are equal. Researchers at Bell Labs have reached speeds over 1 Gbit/s for symmetrical broadband access services using traditional copper telephone lines, though such speeds have not yet been deployed elsewhere.

History
It was originally thought that it was not possible to operate a conventional phone line beyond low-speed limits (typically under 9600 bit/s). In the 1950s, ordinary twisted-pair telephone cable often carried four megahertz (MHz) television signals between studios, suggesting that such lines would allow transmitting many megabits per second. However, these cables had other impairments besides Gaussian noise, preventing such rates from becoming practical in the field. The 1980s saw the development of techniques for broadband communications that allowed the limit to be greatly extended. A patent was filed in 1979 for the use of existing telephone wires for both telephones and data terminals that were connected to a remote computer via a digital data carrier system.

The motivation for digital subscriber line technology was the Integrated Services Digital Network (ISDN) specification proposed in 1984 by the CCITT (now ITU-T) as part of Recommendation I.120, later reused as ISDN digital subscriber line (IDSL). Employees at Bellcore (now Telcordia Technologies) developed asymmetric digital subscriber line (ADSL) by placing wide-band digital signals at frequencies above the existing baseband analog voice signal carried on conventional twisted pair cabling between telephone exchanges and customers. A patent was filed by AT&T Bell Labs on the basic DSL concept in 1988.

Joseph W. Lechleider's contribution to DSL was his insight that an asymmetric arrangement offered more than double the bandwidth capacity of symmetric DSL. This allowed Internet service providers to offer efficient service to consumers, who benefited greatly from the ability to download large amounts of data but rarely needed to upload comparable amounts. ADSL supports two modes of transport: fast channel and interleaved channel. Fast channel is preferred for streaming multimedia, where an occasional dropped bit is acceptable, but lags are less so. Interleaved channel works better for file transfers, where the delivered data must be error-free but latency (time delay) incurred by the retransmission of error-containing packets is acceptable.

Consumer-oriented ADSL was designed to operate on existing lines already conditioned for Basic Rate Interface ISDN services. Engineers developed high speed DSL facilities such as high bit rate digital subscriber line (HDSL) and symmetric digital subscriber line (SDSL) to provision traditional Digital Signal 1 (DS1) services over standard copper pair facilities.

Newer variants improved these rates. Distances greater than  significantly reduce the bandwidth usable on the wires, thus reducing the data rate. But ADSL loop extenders increase these distances by repeating the signal, allowing the local exchange carrier (LEC) to deliver DSL speeds to any distance.

Until the late 1990s, the cost of digital signal processors for DSL was prohibitive. All types of DSL employ highly complex digital signal processing algorithms to overcome the inherent limitations of the existing twisted pair wires. Due to the advancements of very-large-scale integration (VLSI) technology, the cost of the equipment associated with a DSL deployment lowered significantly. The two main pieces of equipment are a digital subscriber line access multiplexer (DSLAM) at one end and a DSL modem at the other end.

A DSL connection can be deployed over existing cable. Such deployment, even including equipment, is much cheaper than installing a new, high-bandwidth fiber-optic cable over the same route and distance. This is true both for ADSL and SDSL variations. The commercial success of DSL and similar technologies largely reflects the advances made in electronics over the decades that have increased performance and reduced costs even while digging trenches in the ground for new cables (copper or fiber optic) remains expensive.

These advantages made ADSL a better proposition for customers requiring Internet access than metered dial up, while also allowing voice calls to be received at the same time as a data connection. Telephone companies were also under pressure to move to ADSL owing to competition from cable companies, which use DOCSIS cable modem technology to achieve similar speeds. Demand for high bandwidth applications, such as video and file sharing, also contributed to the popularity of  ADSL technology.

Early DSL service required a dedicated dry loop, but when the U.S. Federal Communications Commission (FCC) required incumbent local exchange carriers (ILECs) to lease their lines to competing DSL service providers, shared-line DSL became available. Also known as DSL over unbundled network element, this unbundling of services allows a single subscriber to receive two separate services from two separate providers on one cable pair. The DSL service provider's equipment is co-located in the same telephone exchange as that of the ILEC supplying the customer's pre-existing voice service. The subscriber's circuit is rewired to interface with hardware supplied by the ILEC which combines a DSL frequency and POTS signals on a single copper pair.

By 2012, some carriers in the United States reported that DSL remote terminals with fiber backhaul were replacing older ADSL systems.

Operation
Telephones are connected to the telephone exchange via a local loop, which is a physical pair of wires. The local loop was originally intended mostly for the transmission of speech, encompassing an audio frequency range of 300 to 3400 hertz (commercial bandwidth). However, as long-distance trunks were gradually converted from analog to digital operation, the idea of being able to pass data through the local loop (by utilizing frequencies above the voiceband) took hold, ultimately leading to DSL.

The local loop connecting the telephone exchange to most subscribers has the capability of carrying frequencies well beyond the 3400 Hz upper limit of POTS. Depending on the length and quality of the loop, the upper limit can be tens of megahertz. DSL takes advantage of this unused bandwidth of the local loop by creating 4312.5 Hz wide channels starting between 10 and 100 kHz, depending on how the system is configured. Allocation of channels continues to higher frequencies (up to 1.1 MHz for ADSL) until new channels are deemed unusable. Each channel is evaluated for usability in much the same way an analog modem would on a POTS connection. More usable channels equate to more available bandwidth, which is why distance and line quality are a factor (the higher frequencies used by DSL travel only short distances).

The pool of usable channels is then split into two different frequency bands for upstream and downstream traffic, based on a preconfigured ratio. This segregation reduces interference. Once the channel groups have been established, the individual channels are bonded into a pair of virtual circuits, one in each direction. Like analog modems, DSL transceivers constantly monitor the quality of each channel and will add or remove them from service depending on whether they are usable. Once upstream and downstream circuits are established, a subscriber can connect to a service such as an Internet service provider or other network services, like a corporate MPLS network.

The underlying technology of transport across DSL facilities uses modulation of high-frequency carrier waves, an analog signal transmission. A DSL circuit terminates at each end in a modem which modulates patterns of bits into certain high-frequency impulses for transmission to the opposing modem. Signals received from the far-end modem are demodulated to yield a corresponding bit pattern that the modem passes on, in digital form, to its interfaced equipment, such as a computer, router, switch, etc.

Unlike traditional dial-up modems, which modulate bits into signals in the 300–3400 Hz audio baseband, DSL modems modulate frequencies from 4000 Hz to as high as 4 MHz. This frequency band separation enables DSL service and plain old telephone service (POTS) to coexist on the same cables. On the subscriber's end of the circuit, inline DSL filters are installed on each telephone to pass voice frequencies but filter the high-frequency signals that would otherwise be heard as hiss. Also, nonlinear elements in the phone could otherwise generate audible intermodulation and may impair the operation of the data modem in the absence of these low-pass filters.

Because DSL operates above the 3.4 kHz voice limit, it cannot pass through a loading coil, which is an inductive coil that is designed to counteract loss caused by shunt capacitance (capacitance between the two wires of the twisted pair). Loading coils are commonly set at regular intervals in POTS lines. Voice service cannot be maintained past a certain distance without such coils. Therefore, some areas that are within range for DSL service are disqualified from eligibility because of loading coil placement. Because of this, phone companies endeavor to remove loading coils on copper loops that can operate without them. Longer lines that require them can be replaced with fiber to the neighborhood or node (FTTN).

Most residential and small-office DSL implementations reserve low frequencies for POTS, so that (with suitable filters and/or splitters) the existing voice service continues to operate independently of the DSL service. Thus POTS-based communications, including fax machines and dial-up modems, can share the wires with DSL. Only one DSL modem can use the subscriber line at a time. The standard way to let multiple computers share a DSL connection uses a router that establishes a connection between the DSL modem and a local Ethernet, powerline, or Wi-Fi network on the customer's premises.

The theoretical foundations of DSL, like much of communication technology, can be traced back to Claude Shannon's seminal 1948 paper, "A Mathematical Theory of Communication". Generally, higher bit rate transmissions require a wider frequency band, though the ratio of bit rate to symbol rate and thus to bandwidth are not linear due to significant innovations in digital signal processing and digital modulation methods.

Naked DSL

Naked DSL is a way of providing only DSL services over a local loop. It is useful when the customer does not need the traditional telephony voice service because voice service is received either on top of the DSL services (usually VoIP) or through another network (E.g., mobile telephony). It is also commonly called an unbundled network element (UNE) in the United States; in Australia it is known as a unconditioned local loop (ULL); in Belgium it is known as "raw copper" and in the UK it is known as Single Order GEA (SoGEA).

It started making a comeback in the United States in 2004 when Qwest started offering it, closely followed by Speakeasy. As a result of AT&T's merger with SBC, and Verizon's merger with MCI, those telephone companies have an obligation to offer naked DSL to consumers.

Typical setup

On the customer side, a DSL modem is hooked up to a phone line. The telephone company connects the other end of the line to a DSLAM, which concentrates a large number of individual DSL connections into a single box. The DSLAM cannot be located too far from the customer because of attenuation between the DSLAM and the user's DSL modem. It is common for a few residential blocks to be connected to one DSLAM.

The above figure is a schematic of a simple DSL connection (in blue). The right side shows a DSLAM residing in the telephone company's telephone exchange. The left side shows the customer premises equipment with an optional router. The router manages a local area network which connects PCs and other local devices. The customer may opt for a modem that contains both a router and wireless access. This option (within the dashed bubble) often simplifies the connection.

Exchange equipment
At the exchange, a digital subscriber line access multiplexer (DSLAM) terminates the DSL circuits and aggregates them, where they are handed off to other networking transports. The DSLAM terminates all connections and recovers the original digital information. In the case of ADSL, the voice component is also separated at this step, either by a filter integrated in the DSLAM or by specialized filtering equipment installed before it.

Customer equipment

The customer end of the connection consists of a DSL modem. This converts data between the digital signals used by computers and the analog voltage signal of a suitable frequency range which is then applied to the phone line.

In some DSL variations (for example, HDSL), the modem connects directly to the computer via a serial interface, using protocols such as Ethernet or V.35. In other cases (particularly ADSL), it is common for the customer equipment to be integrated with higher-level functionality, such as routing, firewalling, or other application-specific hardware and software. In this case, the equipment is referred to as a gateway.

Most DSL technologies require the installation of appropriate DSL filters to separate the DSL signal from the low-frequency voice signal. The separation can take place either at the demarcation point, or with filters installed at the telephone outlets inside the customer premises.

Modern DSL gateways often integrate routing and other functionality. The system boots, synchronizes the DSL connection and finally establishes the internet IP services and connection between the local network and the service provider, using protocols such as DHCP or PPPoE.

Protocols and configurations
Many DSL technologies implement an Asynchronous Transfer Mode (ATM) layer over the low-level bitstream layer to enable the adaptation of a number of different technologies over the same link.

DSL implementations may create bridged or routed networks. In a bridged configuration, the group of subscriber computers effectively connect into a single subnetwork. The earliest implementations used DHCP to provide the IP address to the subscriber equipment, with authentication via MAC address or an assigned hostname. Later implementations often use Point-to-Point Protocol (PPP) to authenticate with a user ID and password.

Transmission modulation methods
Transmission methods vary by market, region, carrier, and equipment.
 Discrete multitone modulation (DMT), the most common kind, also known as Orthogonal frequency-division multiplexing (OFDM)
 Trellis-coded pulse-amplitude modulation (TC-PAM), used for HDSL2 and SHDSL
 Carrierless amplitude phase modulation (CAP), deprecated in 1996 for ADSL, used for HDSL
 Two-binary, one-quaternary (2B1Q), used for IDSL and HDSL

DSL technologies
DSL technologies (sometimes collectively summarized as xDSL) include:
Symmetric digital subscriber line (SDSL), umbrella term for xDSL where the bitrate is equal in both directions.
ISDN digital subscriber line (IDSL), ISDN-based technology that provides a bitrate equivalent to two ISDN bearer and one data channel, 144 kbit/s symmetric over one pair
High-bit-rate digital subscriber line (HDSL), ITU-T G.991.1, the first DSL technology that used a higher frequency spectrum than ISDN, 1,544 kbit/s and 2,048 kbit/s symmetric services, either on 2 or 3 pairs at 784 kbit/s each, 2 pairs at 1,168 kbit/s each, or one pair at 2,320 kbit/s
High-bit-rate digital subscriber line 2/4 (HDSL2, HDSL4), ANSI, 1,544 kbit/s symmetric over one pair (HDSL2) or two pairs (HDSL4)
Symmetric digital subscriber line (SDSL), specific proprietary technology, up to 1,544 kbit/s symmetric over one pair
Single-pair high-speed digital subscriber line (G.SHDSL), ITU-T G.991.2, standardized successor of HDSL and proprietary SDSL, up to 5,696 kbit/s per pair, up to four pairs
Asymmetric digital subscriber line (ADSL), umbrella term for xDSL where the bitrate is greater in one direction than the other.
ANSI T1.413 Issue 2, up to 8 Mbit/s and 1 Mbit/s
G.dmt, ITU-T G.992.1, up to 10 Mbit/s and 1 Mbit/s
G.lite, ITU-T G.992.2, more noise and attenuation resistant than G.dmt, up to 1,536 kbit/s and 512 kbit/s
Asymmetric digital subscriber line 2 (ADSL2), ITU-T G.992.3, up to 12 Mbit/s and 3.5 Mbit/s
Asymmetric digital subscriber line 2 plus (ADSL2+), ITU-T G.992.5, up to 24 Mbit/s and 3.5 Mbit/s
Very-high-bit-rate digital subscriber line (VDSL), ITU-T G.993.1, up to 52 Mbit/s and 16 Mbit/s
Very-high-bit-rate digital subscriber line 2 (VDSL2), ITU-T G.993.2, an improved version of VDSL, compatible with ADSL2+, sum of both directions up to 200 Mbit/s. G.vector crosstalk cancelling feature (ITU-T G.993.5) can be used to increase range at a given bitrate, e.g. 100 Mbit/s at up to 500 meters.
G.fast, ITU-T G.9700 and G.9701, up to approximately 1 Gbit/s aggregate uplink and downlink at 100m. Approved in December 2014, deployments planned for 2016.
XG-FAST, allows for up to 10 Gbps on copper twisted pair lines, but only for lengths up to 30 meters. Real-world tests have shown 8 Gbps on 30-meter long twisted pair lines.
Bonded DSL Rings (DSL Rings), a shared ring topology at 400 Mbit/s
Cable/DSL gateway
Etherloop Ethernet local loop
High-speed voice and data link
Rate-Adaptive Digital Subscriber Line (RADSL), designed to increase range and noise tolerance by sacrificing upstream speed
Uni-DSL (Uni digital subscriber line or UDSL), technology developed by Texas Instruments, backwards compatible with all DMT standards
 Hybrid Access Networks combine existing xDSL deployments with a wireless network such as LTE to increase bandwidth and quality of experience by balancing the traffic over the two access networks.

The line-length limitations from telephone exchange to subscriber impose severe limits on data transmission rates. Technologies such as VDSL provide very high-speed but short-range links. VDSL is used as a method of delivering triple play services (typically implemented in fiber to the curb network architectures).

Terabit DSL, is a technology that proposes the use of the space between the dielectrics (insulators) on copper twisted pair lines in telephone cables as waveguides for 300 GHz signals that can offer speeds of up to 1 terabit per second at distances of up to 100 meters, 100 gigabits per second for 300 meters, and 10 gigabits per second for 500 meters. The first experiment for this was carried out with copper lines that were parallel to each other, and not twisted, inside a metal pipe meant to simulate the metal sheathing in large telephone cables.

See also
 Dynamic spectrum management (DSM)
 John Cioffi – Known as "the father of DSL"
 List of countries by number of Internet users
 List of interface bit rates

References

Further reading
   pp 53–86

External links

 ADSL Theory—Information about the background & workings of ADSL, and the factors involved in achieving a good sync between your modem and the DSLAM.

 
American inventions
Modems
Internet access